Born in 1890, Oskar Walleck was a native of Brno.

The actor and director joined the NSDAP and the SS in 1932.

In 1934/35, he came to Munich, where he was appointed Generalintendant of the Bayerisches Staatstheater. As such, he also controlled all other Bavarian theaters.

In 1939, Walleck became Generalintendant in Prague.

To stage Rüdiger von Bechelaren, a play by Hans Baumann, Walleck traveled to Passau in 1940.

References

SS personnel
1890 births
Year of death missing
People from Brno